Cabó is a municipality in the comarca of Alt Urgell, Lleida, Catalonia, Spain.

The municipality contains three villages: Cabó, el Vilar de Cabó, and Pujal. It includes a small exclave to the south-east.

References

External links
 Government data pages 

Municipalities in Alt Urgell